Mohammad Salimi (born January 19, 1984, in Tehran) is a presenter and TV host. He has a PhD in science communication. His first live show was Aftab-e SHarghi in 2007. After "Aftab-e SHarghi"  live show, "simay-e khanvadeh", "Tab" , "Taz-e SHo"
 
, "lebas-e irani" and it was the Other his TV shows.

also he is a fashion and clothing expert presenter in iran.he has been the host of several Fajr international fashion and clothing festivals.

References

External links 
 Mohammad Salimi on Instagram

Living people
People from Tehran
1984 births
Iranian television presenters